Six ships of the Royal Navy have borne the name HMS Constance, whilst another was planned:

 HMS Constance was a 22-gun sixth rate that the French launched in 1794 and that the British captured in 1797. The French recaptured her in 1806; she grounded and was salvaged in December, and condemned in February 1807.
 HMS Constance was to have been a 36-gun fifth rate. She was ordered in 1833 but cancelled in 1844.
  was a 3-gun schooner launched in 1838 and sold in 1877.
  was a 50-gun fourth rate launched in 1846. She was converted to steam propulsion in 1862 and was sold in 1875.
  was a screw corvette launched in 1880 and sold in 1899.
  was a  light cruiser launched in 1915 and sold in 1936.
  was a  destroyer launched in 1944 and broken up in 1956.

Royal Navy ship names